Kota Kemuning is a township located in the constituency of Kota Raja, in Klang District, Selangor, Malaysia, just south of Shah Alam. Kota Kemuning borders Putra Heights on its east, across the Klang River.

Background
It is developed by Hicom-Gamuda Development Sdn Bhd, a joint-venture company between DRB-HICOM and Gamuda Berhad. This township is Gamuda Land's first venture into property development in 1994 and is renowned as one of the Klang Valley’s finest residences with its healthy and harmonious living environment. Kota Kemuning is approximately 25 km southwest of Kuala Lumpur City Centre.

Kota Kemuning was within the municipal authority of Klang until a cession in 1994 transferred the township to Shah Alam City Council.

Access

Car
It is accessible via various major highways and expressways namely KESAS  506, and the ELITE . A new expressway; Kemuning–Shah Alam Highway (LKSA) , linking Kota Kemuning to downtown Shah Alam opened in 2010.

Public transportation
 LRT Putra Heights is the closest rail station to Kota Kemuning by distance, but currently there is no direct access between them, as the two townships were separated by a bend of the Klang River.  KTM Shah Alam will be more convenient; it is connected to Kota Kemuning via Smart Selangor bus SA06.

RapidKL bus T756 goes towards Hentian Bandar Shah Alam in Section 14 via Taman Sri Muda. In addition, this bus connects with RapidKL bus 751 from Taman Sri Muda to Pasar Seni, Kuala Lumpur.

Type of development 
Kota Kemuning is a mixed residential and commercial development spanning across  The residential developments consist of bungalows, semi-detached houses, link terrace houses, town houses, condominiums and apartments.  The commercial developments include commercial centres, shop offices, commercial land, terraced and semi-dee factories. The township has an 18 hole golf course known as Kota Permai Golf and Country Club which has held various championships such as the Maybank Malaysian Open and the Volvo Masters. The township also has a park called Kota Kemuning Lakeside Park.

The design concept for Kota Kemuning was meant to make it a self-contained township centered on a resort and golf course living with facilities and amenities. Its key features are the Central Lake and Lakeside Drive with the continuous jogging track, basketball courts as well as its Wetland and Hill Parks.

External links
Kota Kemuning Community Forum 
Gamuda Land
Kota Kemuning Official Website
Kemuning Indah Residences-2 Terrace for sale

Townships in Selangor